Na Jae-min (born August 13, 2000), professionally known as Jaemin, is a South Korean dancer, rapper and actor. After training for three years, Jaemin debuted in August 2016 as a member of South Korean boy group NCTthrough the sub-unit NCT Dream, which went on to become one of the best-selling artists in South Korea.

Jaemin made his debut in acting scene with starred in web series Method to Hate You (2019).

Early life 
Na Jaemin was born in Jeonju, South Korea on August 13, 2000. He grew up in Seoul and studied at Incheon Cheong-il Elementary School; he also attended at Incheon Haewon Middle School and went to School of Performing Arts Seoul (SOPA).

Jaemin became a trainee under SM Entertainment in 2013, at the age of 13, after being street-cast by staff while handing out posters and collecting trash as a volunteer with his mother at an event.

Career

2014–2016: Pre-debut activities 
In 2014, Jaemin began featuring in several events with SM Entertainment's pre-debut training team, SM Rookies. In August 2014, he participated in the SM Town Live World Tour IV with SM Rookies and appeared in several SM Rookies videos. In October 2014, he made his first broadcast appearance on Exo 90:2014, a reality television show starring labelmate Exo, alongside fellow NCT members, where they danced to K-pop songs from the 1990s.

On April 22, 2015, Jaemin was officially announced as a member of SM Rookies. On July 9, he with fellow rookies were also announced as a "Mouseketeers" on the Korean revival of The Mickey Mouse Club, which would be aired on Disney Channel Korea. The show aired from July 23 to December 17, 2015 and was hosted by Leeteuk of Super Junior.

2016–2017: Debut and injury hiatus 

On August 20, 2016, Jaemin was confirmed as the third member of the third sub-unit of NCT, NCT Dream. He officially debuted with NCT Dream's digital single, "Chewing Gum", on August 24.
 On February 2, 2017, prior to the group's second release, the single "My First and Last", it was announced that Jaemin had been placed on hiatus for the rest of the year to recover from a herniated disc.

Jaemin returned to NCT as part of NCT 2018, a special project involving all 18 members of NCT at the time. On March 4, 2018, he made his comeback with NCT Dream with the single "Go", which was part of NCT's first album, NCT 2018 Empathy; it marked his first comeback with the group since its debut. He also took part in the NCT 2018 single "Black on Black" on the same album, which was released in April that year.

Later in 2018, Jaemin joined the cast for the second season of tvN's My English Teen 100 Hours, an educational variety show where cast members studied English intensively for seven hours each day over two weeks before being sent abroad to test their English skills in real life. The variety show began airing on May 20.

Jaemin participated in writing lyrics for the track "Dear Dream" of NCT Dream's second EP We Go Up. The EP was released on September 3, 2018.  He has since written lyrics for tracks on NCT Dream's subsequent albums.

2019–present: Acting debut, solo activities, and NCT U debut 
On March 13, 2019, Jaemin, alongside fellow NCT Dream members Jeno and Jisung, represented K-pop stars at the "K-Wave & Halal Show" in Malaysia. The friendship event between South Korea and Malaysia was attended by President Moon as part of his three-day state visit to the country. In April, Jaemin made his acting debut as the role of Han Dae-gang, the male lead character in JTBC's short web-drama Method to Hate You, based on a popular webtoon of the same name. That year, Jaemin also appeared on the gaming variety show Do You Want To Play? GG, where celebrities formed a team to play against high school students in a variety of games; the show began airing in May.

In October 2020, Jaemin officially made his debut as a member of NCT U with the song "Make A Wish (Birthday Song)" on Mnet's music broadcast show M Countdown. While he participated in NCT U's special stage "Kick and Ride" in June 2020, the single marked his first official release with the unit.

In October 2021, Jaemin appeared on the cover of WWD Korea magazine's Special Edition No.02, released in collaboration with Tom Ford and photographer Adam Katz Sinding.

Philanthropy 

In November 2018, Jaemin joined UNICEF Korea Special Representative Siwon Choi in Vietnam for UNICEF's World Children's Day celebration campaign against school violence. In March 2019, Jaemin attended UNICEF Korea committee's event "For Every Child" as a youth representative, meeting with Queen Mathilde of Belgium and former President of International Criminal Court Song Sang-hyun. In May of the same year, Jaemin, along with fellow NCT Dream member Jeno, visited children living in slums in Indonesia with South Korea-based non-governmental organization Good Neighbors.

Filmography

Television

Songwriting credits 
All credits are adapted from the Korea Music Copyright Association, unless stated otherwise.

Awards and nominations

References

External links 

2000 births
Living people
People from Jeonju
NCT (band) members
K-pop singers
SM Rookies members
SM Entertainment artists
South Korean male singers
South Korean male pop singers
South Korean male web series actors
South Korean male idols
South Korean television personalities
21st-century South Korean male singers
21st-century South Korean male actors